Visitors to Kyrgyzstan must obtain a visa in advance online or from one of the Kyrgyzstan diplomatic missions unless they come from one of the visa-exempt countries or countries whose citizens are eligible for a visa upon arrival. Despite proposals to abolish the visa-free regime, the Prime Minister of Kyrgyzstan vowed to retain the current policy in December 2015.

Kyrgyzstan currently gives visa exemption to citizens of 69 nations.

Visa policy map

Visa exemption
Holders of passports issued by the following 69 nations are not required to obtain a visa for Kyrgyzstan up to the length of stay mentioned below:

Additionally only holders of diplomatic or official/service passports of China, India, Indonesia, Iran, Morocco and Turkmenistan can visit Kyrgyzstan without a visa.

Visa on arrival
Citizens of the following countries and territories are eligible to obtain a visa on arrival valid for a maximum stay of 30 days at Manas International Airport:

Citizens of the following countries and territories are eligible to obtain a visa on arrival valid for stays longer than 60 days at Manas International Airport:

In addition, holders of passports issued by Taiwan can obtain a visa on arrival provided they are holding a pre-arranged landing visa invitation.

Visa replacement 
Nationals of the following countries who hold valid tourist visas of Kazakhstan are able to visit the border districts of Issyk-Kul, Talas and Chüy regions of Kyrgyzstan within the validity of such visa: Australia, Austria, Belgium, Bulgaria, Canada, Croatia, Czech Republic, Denmark, Finland, France, Germany, Greece, Hungary, Iceland, Ireland, Israel, Italy, Japan, Liechtenstein, Luxembourg, Malaysia, Monaco, Netherlands, New Zealand, Norway, Portugal, Poland, Romania, Singapore, Slovakia, South Korea, Spain, Sweden, Switzerland, United Kingdom and the United States.

Citizens of the following countries and territories are eligible to obtain a visa on arrival valid for a maximum stay of 60 days at Manas International Airport -  if they hold a valid residence visa of Bahrain, Brunei, Kuwait, Oman, Qatar or United Arab Emirates

Electronic visa 
From 1 September 2017 citizens of all countries and territories may apply for tourism, business and group tourist types of visa for 30 or 90 days online through the eVisa system. Electronic visa holders must arrive via Manas or Osh airports or through land crossings with China (at Irkeshtam and Torugart), Kazakhstan (at Ak-jol, Ak-Tilek, Chaldybar, Chon-Kapka), Tajikistan (at Bor-Dobo, Kulundu, Kyzyl-Bel) and Uzbekistan (at Dostuk).

Visitor statistics

Most visitors arriving to Kyrgyzstan were from the following countries of nationality:

See also

Visa requirements for Kyrgyzstani citizens

References

Kyrgyzstan
Foreign relations of Kyrgyzstan